James Joseph Lindsay (born October 10, 1932) is a retired United States Army four-star general, and served as the first commander of the United States Special Operations Command.

Military career
Lindsay's military career began when he enlisted in the Army in 1952. He graduated from the U.S. Army Officer Candidate School in May 1953 as a Second Lieutenant in the Infantry. His military education includes the Infantry Officer Advanced Course, Army Language School (German and Russian) the US Marine Corps Command and Staff College and the National War College. He earned a bachelor's degree from the University of Nebraska at Omaha and a Master of Science degree in Foreign Affairs from George Washington University.

Lindsay commanded units at all levels, from platoon through MACOM, in both peacetime and war. His first assignments were with the 82nd Airborne Division,  7th Special Forces Group and Military Intelligence. Within the 82nd Airborne Division he held eight assignments, from platoon to division level. During the Vietnam War, he was an advisor to the Vietnamese Airborne Brigade, commanded the 2nd Battalion, 60th Infantry Regiment, 9th Infantry Division and was the G3 (Assistant Chief-of-Staff, Operations and Plans) for the 9th Infantry Division.

As a general, Lindsay commanded the 82nd Airborne Division, the United States Army Infantry School, the XVIII Airborne Corps, the United States Readiness Command, and was the first Commander in Chief, United States Special Operations Command. General Lindsay retired July 1, 1990.

Awards and decorations

Distinguished Service Cross

Citation:
The President of the United States of America, authorized by Act of Congress, July 9, 1918 (amended by act of July 25, 1963), takes pleasure in presenting the Distinguished Service Cross to Lieutenant Colonel (Infantry) James Joseph Lindsay (ASN: 0-75235), United States Army, for extraordinary heroism in connection with military operations involving conflict with an armed hostile force in the Republic of Vietnam, while serving with Headquarters, 2d Battalion, 60th Infantry, 1st Brigade, 9th Infantry Division. Lieutenant Colonel Lindsay distinguished himself by exceptionally valorous actions from 31 May to 4 June 1968 during an operation which located and destroyed three main force Viet Cong and North Vietnamese battalions in the Plain of Reeds. After two days of tracking the enemy, Colonel Lindsay accompanied his battalion as it was inserted by air into the flank of the communists. Immediately upon landing, his men were brought under extremely heavy automatic weapons and small arms fire from a nearby woodline. Moving from position to position under the hail of bullets, he directed his troops' fire and, once fire superiority had been gained, led an assault into the hostile bunker complex which destroyed sixty of the fortifications and forced the enemy to withdraw. He then entered his helicopter and flew low over the embattled area to direct the encirclement of the foe. Noticing a group of Viet Cong escaping across a small canal which had not yet been sealed off, he stopped them with hand grenades and rifle fire. After returning to the ground, he exposed himself to the vicious enemy fusillade to coordinate return fire which repelled the enemy's attempt to break the encirclement. While leading a sweep through the woodline early in the morning of 4 June, he surprised three Viet Cong whom he engaged and killed before they could inflict any casualties upon his men. Lieutenant Colonel Lindsay's extraordinary heroism and devotion to duty were in keeping with the highest traditions of the military service and reflect great credit upon himself, his unit, and the United States Army.

Commendations
General Lindsay's awards and decorations include:

Post military

In retirement, Lindsay founded the Airborne and Special Operations Museum Foundation in 1990. He served as a senior mentor for the Army's Battle Command Training Program (BCTP) from 1990 to 2009. He was inducted into both the United States Army Ranger Hall of Fame and the Officer Candidate School Hall of Fame. He was the 1996 recipient of the National Infantry Association's Doughboy Award and the 1998 recipient of the United States Special Operations Command's Bull Simons Award.

Lindsay and his wife, Gerry, live in Vass, North Carolina.  Their children include: Steven, Michael, Kevin, and Barbara.

References

External links

United States Army generals
Recipients of the Distinguished Service Cross (United States)
Recipients of the Distinguished Service Medal (US Army)
Recipients of the Silver Star
Recipients of the Legion of Merit
Recipients of the Gallantry Cross (Vietnam)
University of Nebraska Omaha alumni
Elliott School of International Affairs alumni
People from Portage, Wisconsin
Military personnel from Wisconsin
1932 births
Living people
Recipients of the Air Medal